Dmitri Vyacheslavovich Shilov (born 30 January 1991) is a Russian professional football player. He plays for FC Tekstilshchik Ivanovo.

Club career
He made his Russian Football National League debut for FC Arsenal Tula on 7 July 2013 in a game against FC Dynamo Saint Petersburg.

External links
 

1991 births
Sportspeople from Tula, Russia
Living people
Russian footballers
Association football midfielders
FC Arsenal Tula players
FC Tekstilshchik Ivanovo players
FC Khimik Dzerzhinsk players
FC Shinnik Yaroslavl players
FC Znamya Truda Orekhovo-Zuyevo players